The 1937 Tonbridge by-election was held on 23 March 1937.  The by-election was held due to the death of the incumbent Conservative MP, Herbert Spender-Clay.  It was won by the Conservative candidate Adrian Baillie.

Candidates
Adrian Baillie had previously been the Unionist MP for the normally Labour seat of Linlithgowshire from 1931  to 1935.

The Liberal challenger was 59 year-old Borlase Matthews. He was Liberal candidate at Henley for the 1931 general election, the 1932 Henley by-election and at Ashford for the 1935 general election. He was an engineer but left engineering to take up farming. He was a Member of the Council of the Royal Agricultural Society. He was a Member of the Electricity Commissioners Rural Electrification Conference. He was Chairman of the Rural Reconstruction Association. He was also an author of several books and papers on farming.

Result

References

1937 in England
Tonbridge and Malling
1937 elections in the United Kingdom
By-elections to the Parliament of the United Kingdom in Kent constituencies
1930s in Kent